Tapinoma troche is an extinct species of ant in the genus Tapinoma. Described by Wilson in 1985, fossils of the species were found in the Dominican amber, where a fossilised worker of the species was described.

References

Miocene insects
†
Fossil ant taxa
Hymenoptera of North America
Fossil taxa described in 1985